Queenslander may refer to:

 Queenslander, a person from the Australian state of Queensland
 Queenslander, the name of a train service operated by Queensland Rail
 Queenslander (architecture), a style of architecture found in Queensland
 The Queenslander, a newspaper published from 1866 to 1939